Regis or Régis is a given name. Notable persons with that surname include:

Balthasar Regis (died 1757), Canon of Windsor
Cyrille Regis (1958–2018), English association football player
Dave Regis (born 1964), English association football player
David Regis (born 1968), French-American association football player
Ed Regis (author) (born 1944), American author and educator
Hazel-Ann Regis (born 1981), Grenadian sprinter
Jean-Baptiste Régis (died 1738), French Jesuit missionary
John Regis (athlete) (born 1966), English sprinter
Johannes Regis (c. 1425 – c. 1496), Franco-Flemish composer
John Francis Regis (1597–1640), French Jesuit and Roman Catholic saint
Louis-Marie Régis (1903–1988), Canadian philosopher, theologian, and scholar
Miles Regis (born 1967), American-Trinidadian multi-media artist
Pierre-Sylvain Régis (1632–1707), French philosopher
Robert Regis (born 1967), English association football player
Rogério Fidélis Régis (born 1976), Brazilian football player
Sheryn Regis (born 1980), Filipina pop singer and composer
Simone Régis, Brazilian fashion model and beauty queen